Stubblefield, Texas may refer to the following places:

 Stubblefield, Houston County, Texas
 Stubblefield, Johnson County, Texas

See also 
 Stubblefield (disambiguation)